The Big Gusher is a 1951 American adventure film directed by Lew Landers and starring Wayne Morris and Preston Foster. A pair oil prospectors on a drunken spree buy an apparently worthless piece of land from a con man, then attempt to find if there may really be oil there.

Plot

Partial cast
 Wayne Morris as Kenny Blake 
 Preston Foster as Henry 'Hank' Mason 
 Dorothy Patrick as Betsy Abbott 
 Paul E. Burns as Cappy Groves 
 Emmett Vogan as Jim Tolman

References

Bibliography
 Dick, Bernard F. Columbia Pictures: Portrait of a Studio. University Press of Kentucky, 2015.

External links
 

1951 films
1951 adventure films
American adventure films
Columbia Pictures films
Films directed by Lew Landers
Works about petroleum
American black-and-white films
1950s English-language films
1950s American films